Calvay or Calbhaigh meaning "calf island" in Scottish Gaelic could refer to one of three islets off the coast of South Uist in Scotland:

Calvay, an island in the Sound of Eriskay;
Calbhaigh, an island at the entrance to Loch Boisdale near to which Calvay Castle is found;
Calbhaigh, a tidal island in Loch Eynort